For the 1989–90 West Ham United F.C. season in English football, West Ham United finished 7th in the league.

Season summary

In only the second game of the season the West Ham fans chanted "We hate Paul Ince" after they discovered through a national newspaper of the player's transfer to Manchester United. Ince had reportedly been a transfer target for Alex Ferguson since the end of the previous campaign, the transfer finally being completed on 14 September 1989, by which time Ince had already played a Second Division game for the Hammers.

With the dismissal of long serving manager John Lyall on 5 June 1989, speculation mounted about who was going to succeed him. AFC Bournemouth manager and former Hammers player Harry Redknapp was strongly linked to the vacancy, but Swindon Town's Lou Macari (who had taken the Wiltshire club to the verge of the First Division just three years after promotion from the Fourth Division) was unveiled as the club's new manager on 3 July 1989.

Macari lasted less than a year as manager. Amid allegations that he was involved in illegal payments at Swindon Town (a scandal which saw Swindon's promotion to the First Division being withdrawn at the end of the 1989–90 season) he resigned on 18 February 1990. Club legend Billy Bonds was appointed manager in his place, and saw the Hammers complete their impressive run to the League Cup semi-finals for the second season in succession, but seventh place in the final league table was not quite enough for a play-off place. It could very well have been a different story had key striker Frank McAvennie not been absent for almost all of the campaign, breaking his leg on the opening day of the season against Stoke City and only managing four more league appearances that campaign when he made his comeback.

However, some new signings, including Ludek Miklosko, Trevor Morley and Ian Bishop, went on to become West Ham legends.

Results
West Ham United's score comes first

Football League First Division

FA Cup

League Cup

Squad

References

1989-90
1989–90 Football League Second Division by team
1989 sports events in London
1990 sports events in London